In Lewes, Delaware the Zwaanendael Museum was created to honor the 300th anniversary of Delaware's first European settlement, Zwaanendael, founded 1631. The museum models the former City Hall in Hoorn, Netherlands. It has 17th century Dutch elements such as stepped facade gable, terra cotta roof tiles, carved stonework, and decorated shutters. The  top of the building's front features a statue of David Pietersen de Vries, leader of the expedition that founded Swanendael.

The museum's exhibits represent the history of Sussex County by revealing the history of those who lived in Delaware's southeastern coast.  Exhibits include local history, shipwrecks and lighthouses, Cape Henlopen Lighthouse, the bombardment of Lewes by the British in the War of 1812, pilots of the Delaware River and Bay, and the ever-changing Delaware coastline. It also has a feejee mermaid on display, originally from China but purchased by a local family and donated on loan before

See also
 History of the Netherlands
 New Netherland
 Zwaanendael Colony
 De Vries Palisade
 List of museums in Delaware

References

External links

Dutch-American culture in Delaware
Buildings and structures in Lewes, Delaware
Museums established in 1931
History museums in Delaware
Museums in Sussex County, Delaware
Historic district contributing properties in Delaware
1931 establishments in Delaware
National Register of Historic Places in Sussex County, Delaware
Buildings and structures on the National Register of Historic Places in Delaware